Sergio Martínez Mantecón (born 8 June 1980) is a Spanish former professional footballer who played as a defensive midfielder.

He appeared in 270 Segunda División games over ten seasons, scoring a total of nine goals for Badajoz, Hércules, Castellón, Elche and Cádiz. In La Liga, he appeared with Elche (12 matches).

Club career
Born in Madrid, Mantecón finished his youth career with local giants Real Madrid, but made his senior debut with CD Badajoz's reserves. On 3 January 2001 he played his first professional game with the latter's first team, coming on as a second-half substitute in a 0–4 home loss against Racing de Santander for that season's Copa del Rey. He finished the league campaign with eight Segunda División appearances.

The following two years, Mantecón was a regular starter for the Extremaduran side, being relegated in 2003. In August of that year he signed with Alicante CF of Segunda División B, going on to appear twice in the promotion playoffs but falling consecutively short.

On 29 June 2006, Mantecón moved to Hércules CF in the second division. After being regularly used in his first season he was left out of the squad in his second, and subsequently joined third-tier SD Ponferradina in January 2008.

Mantecón agreed to a two-year contract with CD Castellón on 24 June 2008. After experiencing another relegation in 2010, he joined fellow league club Elche CF in the off-season. He started in 25 of his 39 matches in 2012–13 as they returned to La Liga after more than two decades, then signed a new one-year deal.

On 19 August 2013, the 33-year-old Mantecón made his debut in the Spanish top flight, replacing David Generelo midway through the second half of a 3–0 away defeat to Rayo Vallecano. After only 12 appearances and two starts during the season, he was released in June 2014 and moved to Cádiz CF of division three.

In February 2017, Mantecón signed with Tercera División club CF Lorca Deportiva, and retired shortly after. In July, he returned to Elche as part of the technical staff.

Mantecón served as interim manager of the main squad on 29 November 2021 for a top-tier match against CA Osasuna, after Fran Escribá was dismissed.

References

External links

1980 births
Living people
Footballers from Madrid
Spanish footballers
Association football midfielders
La Liga players
Segunda División players
Segunda División B players
Tercera División players
CD Badajoz players
Alicante CF footballers
Hércules CF players
SD Ponferradina players
CD Castellón footballers
Elche CF players
Cádiz CF players
Spanish football managers
La Liga managers
Elche CF managers